Rachid Roussafi (born 16 December 1970) is a Moroccan windsurfer. He competed in the men's Mistral One Design event at the 2000 Summer Olympics.

References

1970 births
Living people
Moroccan male sailors (sport)
Moroccan windsurfers
Olympic sailors of Morocco
Sailors at the 2000 Summer Olympics – Mistral One Design
Place of birth missing (living people)